Roger Romani (born 25 August 1934) is a member of the Senate of France, representing the city of Paris.  He is a member of the Union for a Popular Movement.  Currently he serves as a vice-president of the Senate.

References
Page on the Senate website

1934 births
Living people
French Senators of the Fifth Republic
French people of Italian descent
Politicians from Paris
Union for a Popular Movement politicians
Senators of Paris